

England

Head coach: Mike Davis

 Bill Beaumont (c.)
 Phil Blakeway
 Tony Bond
 John Carleton
 Maurice Colclough
 Fran Cotton
 Paul Dodge
 Dusty Hare
 John Horton
 Nigel Horton
 Tony Neary
 Nick Preston
 Mike Rafter
 John Scott
 Mike Slemen
 Steve Smith
 Roger Uttley
 Peter Wheeler
 Clive Woodward

France

Head coach: Jean Desclaux

 Jean-Michel Aguirre
 Jean-Luc Averous
 Roland Bertranne
 Daniel Bustaffa
 Manuel Carpentier
 Alain Caussade
 Michel Clemente
 Didier Codorniou
 Frédéric Costes
 Philippe Dintrans
 Pierre Dospital
 Yves Duhard
 Serge Gabernet
 Jérôme Gallion
 Jean-François Gourdon
 Francis Haget
 Jean-Luc Joinel
 Alain Maleig
 Jean-François Marchal
 Alain Paco
 Robert Paparemborde
 Pierre Pedeutour
 Jean-Pierre Rives (c.)
 Patrick Salas
 Armand Vaquerin

Ireland

Head coach: Tom Kiernan

 Ian Burns
 Ollie Campbell
 Willie Duggan
 Ciaran Fitzgerald
 Mick Fitzpatrick
 Brendan Foley
 James Glennon
 David Irwin
 Moss Keane
 Terry Kennedy
 Alistair McKibbin
 Freddie McLennan
 Ginger McLoughlin
 Paul McNaughton
 John Moloney
 Kevin O'Brien
 Rodney O'Donnell
 John O'Driscoll
 Phil Orr
 Colin Patterson
 Fergus Slattery (c.)
 Donal Spring
 Colm Tucker

Scotland

Head coach: Jim Telfer

 John Beattie
 Mike Biggar (c.)*
 Alex Brewster
 James Burnett
 Bill Cuthbertson
 Colin Deans
 Gordon Dickson
 Brian Gossman
 David Gray
 Bruce Hay
 Andy Irvine (c.)**
 David Johnston
 Roy Laidlaw
 Kenneth Lawrie
 Alan Lawson
 David Leslie
 Iain Milne
 Steve Munro
 Jim Renwick
 Keith Robertson
 Norrie Rowan
 John Rutherford
 Alan Tomes
* captain in the first three games
** captain in the last game

Wales

Head coach: John Lloyd

 Roger Blyth
 Eddie Butler
 Gareth Davies
 Steve Fenwick
 Terry Holmes
 Les Keen
 Stuart Lane
 Allan Martin
 Peter Morgan
 Alan Phillips
 Graham Price
 Elgan Rees
 David Richards
 Paul Ringer
 Jeff Squire (c.)
 Geoff Wheel
 Clive Williams

External links
1980 Five Nations Championship at ESPN

Six Nations Championship squads